Jaroslav Malina may refer to:

 Jaroslav Malina (scenographer) (1937–2016), scenographer from the Czech Republic
 Jaroslav Malina (anthropologist) (born 1945), Czech archaeologist and anthropologist